Karl-Hans Riehm (born 31 May 1951 in Konz, Rhineland-Palatinate) is a former West German hammer thrower.

His biggest success came at the 1984 Summer Olympics held in Los Angeles, United States where he won the silver medal. At the previous Olympics he had a tenth place from 1972 and a fourth place from 1976. In addition he won the bronze medal at the 1978 European Championships and finished seventh at the 1983 World Championships.

His personal best throw was 80.80 metres, achieved in July 1980 in Rhede. This ranks him tenth among German hammer throwers, behind Ralf Haber, Heinz Weis, Karsten Kobs, Günther Rodehau, Holger Klose, Christoph Sahner, Klaus Ploghaus, Markus Esser and Matthias Moder.

References

External links
 
 
 

1951 births
Living people
People from Trier-Saarburg
German male hammer throwers
West German male hammer throwers
Olympic athletes of West Germany
Olympic silver medalists for West Germany
Athletes (track and field) at the 1972 Summer Olympics
Athletes (track and field) at the 1976 Summer Olympics
Athletes (track and field) at the 1984 Summer Olympics
World Athletics Championships athletes for West Germany
European Athletics Championships medalists
Medalists at the 1984 Summer Olympics
Olympic silver medalists in athletics (track and field)
Sportspeople from Rhineland-Palatinate